Nationalisms Across the Globe is a book series established by Tomasz Kamusella (University of St Andrews) and edited together with Krzysztof Jaskułowski (Warsaw School of Social Sciences and Humanities) for Peter Lang. It publishes peer-reviewed monographs and collections of academic articles on various facets of nationalism and its manifestations and ramifications in different parts of the world. The series has been used by specialists in comparative studies. The series is affiliated with the Institute for Transnational and Spatial History at the University of St Andrews.

Volumes published 
 Volume 1 (inaugural): Kamusella, Tomasz and Jaskułowski, Krzysztof, eds. 2009. Nationalisms Today.  
 Volume 2: Obracht-Prondzyński, Cezary and Wicherkiewicz, Tomasz, eds. 2011. The Kashubs: Past and Present. , 
 Volume 3: Ndlovu-Gatsheni, Sabelo J. and Muzondidya, James, eds. 2011. Redemptive or Grotesque Nationalism: Rethinking Contemporary Politics in Zimbabwe. , 
 Volume 4: Tendi, Blessing-Miles. 2010. Making History in Mugabe's Zimbabwe: Politics, Intellectuals and the Media. 
 Volume 5: Koktsidis, Pavlos I. 2012. Strategic Rebellion: Ethnic Conflict in FYR Macedonia and the Balkans. , 
 Volume 6: Sawczuk, Janusz. 2011. Turbulentes 1989. Genese der deutschen Einheit (translated from the Polish by Jens Frasek). , 
 Volume 7: Kostov, Chris. 2010. Contested Ethnic Identity: The Case of Macedonian Immigrants in Toronto, 1900-1996. , 
 Volume 8: Maxwell, Alexander, ed. 2011. The East-West Symbolic Geography and its Consequences. 
 Volume 9: Bielewska, Agnieszka. 2012. Changing Polish Identities: Accession Polish Migrants in Manchester. 
 Volume 10: Blomqvist, Anders E B; Iordachi, Constantin and Trencsényi, Balázs, eds. 2013. Hungary and Romania Beyond National Narratives: Comparisons and Entanglements. 
 Volume 11: Khromeychuk, Olesya. 2013.  'Undetermined' Ukrainians: Post-War Narratives of the Waffen SS 'Galicia' Division.   
 Volume 12: Leach, Michael; Scambary, James; Clarke, Matthew; Feeny, Simon and Wallace, Heather. 2013. Attitudes to National Identity in Melanesia and Timor-Leste: A Survey of Future Leaders in Papua New Guinea, Solomon Islands, Vanuatu and Timor-Leste. 
 Volume 13: Nimni, Ephraim; Osipov, Alexander and Smith, David J., eds. 2013. The Challenge of Non-Territorial Autonomy: Theory and Practice. 
 Volume 14: Vihman, Virve-Anneli and Praakli, Kristiina, eds. 2014. Negotiating Linguistic Identity: Language and Belonging in Europe. 
 Volume 15: Kalemaj, Ilir. 2014. Contested Borders: Territorialization, National Identity and «Imagined Geographies» in Albania. 
 Volume 16: Neuburger, Martina and Dörrenbächer, H. Peter, eds. 2015. Nationalisms and Identities among Indigenous Peoples: Case Studies from North America. 
 Volume 17: Szeligowska, Dorota. 2016. Polish Patriotism after 1989. 
 Volume 18: Ibarra Güell, Pedro and Kolas, Ashild. 2016. Basque Nationhood: Towards a Democratic Scenario.  
 Volume 19: Goikoetxea, Jule. 2017. Privatizing Democracy: Global Ideals, European Politics and Basque Territories.

See also
 Nationalism
 Chauvinism
 Gellner's theory of nationalism
 Jingoism
 List of figures in nationalism
 List of historical separatist movements
 Neo-nationalism
 List of nationalist organizations
 List of active nationalist parties in Europe
 Lists of active separatist movements
 National memory
 Nationalism studies, an interdisciplinary academic field devoted to the study of nationalism
 Nationalist historiography
 Romantic nationalism
 Xenophobia
 Nationalism in the Middle Ages

References 

Works about nationalism
Book series introduced in 2009
Comparative politics
University of St Andrews
Collaborative book series
Monographic series
Series of history books